Pristimantis chrysops is a species of frog in the family Strabomantidae.
It is endemic to Colombia.
Its natural habitats are tropical moist lowland forests and moist montane forests.
It is threatened by habitat loss.

References

chrysops
Amphibians of Colombia
Endemic fauna of Colombia
Amphibians described in 1996
Taxonomy articles created by Polbot